Anne Cole is an American swimwear brand most known for the invention of the tankini, a type of swimsuit. The brand's namesake founder, Anne Cole (1926-2017), invented the tankini.

The swimwear company was originally a division within Cole of California, a knitwear company founded by Cole's father, Fred Cole. Anne Cole began to work for Cole of California in sales and marketing in 1951. During that era, the brand attracted celebrities such as Esther Williams, Elizabeth Taylor, and Marilyn Monroe. In 1982, after decades of designing women's swimsuits, Anne Cole created her own eponymous swimwear brand, Anne Cole Swimwear. Anne Cole designed several swimsuits for the Cole of California and Anne Cole Swimwear brand, including the “Scandal Suit,” a one-piece swimsuit with mesh inserts that became the first swimsuit to break $1 million in sales in 1964. Anne Cole also created the camisole "camkini" and the strapless "bandeaukini" swimsuit. Anne Cole expanded into ladies’ activewear in 2021 with Anne Cole Active. InMocean currently owns Anne Cole Swimwear.

References 

Swimwear brands
American brands
Year of birth missing (living people)